DuckTales: Scrooge's Loot is a DuckTales-based video game available for iOS and Android. It was released in Canada on July 26, 2013, and the US in September, before being available in other countries. It was developed by Disney Interactive Studios and Canadian studio Complex Games.

Storyline 
Uncle Scrooge is robbed by Flintheart Glomgold, Ma Beagle, and Magica De Spell. The player has to recover as much stolen loot as possible.

See also
List of Disney video games

References

 Slide to Play | All About iOS Gaming 
 DuckTales: Scrooge’s Loot Preview
 There's a Canada-only DuckTales iOS third-person shooter
 Weird News Alert: A 'DuckTales' Free-to-play 3rd-person Shooter Has Landed in the Canadian App Store
 DuckTales: Scrooge's Loot
 'DuckTales: Scrooge's Loot' Review - A-Woo-Meh
 DuckTales: Scrooge’s Loot Review
 DuckTales Scrooge's Loot on iOS, Android

2013 video games
IOS games
Android (operating system) games
Disney video games
Video games based on DuckTales
Video games developed in Canada